Haydn Lewis (born 2 January 1986) is a professional Barbadian tennis player.

Lewis reached his highest individual ranking on the ATP Tour on 27 October 2008, when he became World number 583.  He primarily plays on the Futures circuit and the Challenger circuit.

Lewis is a member of the Barbadian Davis Cup team, having posted a 24–7 record in singles and a 15–9 record in doubles in thirty-six ties played.

ATP Challenger Tour and ITF Futures finals

Singles: 3 (3 runners-up)

External links

1986 births
Living people
Barbadian male tennis players
Tennis players at the 2015 Pan American Games
Pan American Games competitors for Barbados
Tennis players at the 2011 Pan American Games
Tennis players at the 2010 Commonwealth Games
Tennis players at the 2019 Pan American Games
Tennis players at the 2007 Pan American Games
Commonwealth Games competitors for Barbados